Queen of the Damned: Music from the Motion Picture is the official soundtrack for the 2002 vampire film Queen of the Damned, released on February 19, 2002 via Warner Music Group. It was produced by Richard Gibbs and Jonathan Davis of American nu metal band Korn. Frank Fitzpatrick and Rich Dickerson served as the music supervisors for the album.

History 
The original motion picture soundtrack for the film was Jonathan Davis' first musical project outside of his band, Korn. Originally, he was supposed to perform vocals on the soundtrack, but due to limitations in his record label contract with Sony, prohibiting his voice to appear on disc, he could not. Jeff Scott Soto was subsequently hired to do the vocal work, but didn't make the final cut either. Instead, five of Jon's friends from other bands were chosen, including Wayne Static of Static-X, David Draiman of Disturbed, Chester Bennington of Linkin Park, Marilyn Manson, and Jay Gordon of Orgy. Head and Munky from Korn, Sam Rivers of Limp Bizkit, L. Shankar,  Vinnie Colaiuta and Terry Bozzio rounded out the studio musicians.

Track listing

Other songs

Jonathan Davis
"Careless (Akasha's Lament)" – 3:39
This song was omitted from the soundtrack album, however Jonathan Davis released it in downloadable form via Amazon and iTunes on November 16, 2007. It is also available on the live album Alone I Play.

Five additional songs, all written and performed by Jonathan Davis, were recorded (as shown in the credits of the movie Queen of the Damned) but did not make it on the official soundtrack. The songs were subsequently performed by other artists as shown on the official track listing. Davis's versions were eventually released as bonus material on the DVD and Blu-ray versions of the movie, including music videos.
"Forsaken" – 3:39
"Redeemer" – 3:45
"System" – 4:44
"Slept So Long" – 4:22
"Not Meant for Me" – 2:42

Richard Gibbs has confirmed that there are two more songs that Jonathan Davis wrote, but it is unlikely that they will be released.

Aaliyah
Late actress and R&B singer Aaliyah, who played Akasha in the movie, was not featured on the soundtrack. Before her death, Davis and Aaliyah had planned to record a duet.

Year-end charts

Certifications

References 

Korn
Works based on The Vampire Chronicles
Horror film soundtracks
2002 soundtrack albums
Nu metal albums